Mystical Scent ( 神香 ) is a music work for the original soundtrack of the feature film Prince of Himalayas,
composed by He Xuntian in 2007.

Summary
Mystical Scent has eleven movements: 
 Sacred Book 盛典
 Son of Destiny 命运之子
 Mystical Scent 神香
 Wolf-Woman Lake 狼婆湖
 Tibetan Drama Dance 藏戏舞
 Lover 恋人
 Mountain Song 山歌
 Mystical Scent 神香
 Journey 征途
 The Last Tear 最后的眼泪
 Mystical Scent 神香

References

External links

Compositions by He Xuntian
2007 compositions